{{DISPLAYTITLE:C18H24O5S}}
The molecular formula C18H24O5S (molar mass: 352.45 g/mol, exact mass: 352.1344 u) may refer to:

 Estradiol 17β-sulfate
 Estradiol sulfate (E2S), or 17β-estradiol 3-sulfate